Siphonochelus syringianus is a species of sea snail, a marine gastropod mollusk in the family Muricidae, the murex snails or rock snails.

Description
Each whorl sculptured with 4 or 5 double varices, each consisting of two strong, smooth axial folds. A single erect, backwards-pointing hollow posterior siphonal tube situated on the shoulder between the folds of each varix. Scar of former outer lip in hollow between each double varix. Anterior canal completely closed, about equal in length to aperture. Colour fawn, sometimes with a broad spiral white band on the body whorl.

Distribution

References

Siphonochelus
Gastropods described in 1903